Andy Ahmad is a Singaporean footballer who plays for Woodlands Wellington FC, primarily in the Prime League as a midfielder. 

Andy began his career with Woodlands Wellington in 2010, before he transferred to Gombak United for the 2011 S.League season. In 2012, he returned to Woodlands where he made 8 substitute appearances.

Club Career Statistics
 

All numbers encased in brackets signify substitute appearances.

References

Singaporean footballers
Woodlands Wellington FC players
Living people
1991 births
Gombak United FC players
Association football midfielders
Singapore Premier League players